The Navy Aviator is a 1914 American silent short drama film written by Lorimer Johnston and directed by Sydney Ayres. The film stars Ayres, Caroline Cooke, Jack Richardson, Vivian Rich, and Harry von Meter.

External links

1914 films
1914 drama films
Silent American drama films
American silent short films
American aviation films
American black-and-white films
1914 short films
Films directed by Sydney Ayres
1910s American films